China Communications Construction Company, Ltd. (CCCC) is a majority state-owned, publicly traded, multinational engineering and construction company primarily engaged in the design, construction and operation of infrastructure assets, including highways, bridges, tunnels, railways (especially high-speed rail), subways, airports, oil platforms, and marine ports. CCCC has been a contractor for numerous Belt and Road Initiative projects.

History 
CCCC's predecessors can be traced back to the Qing Dynasty, when the Junpu Engineering Bureau was established in 1905. The company was officially formed in 2005 by the merger of China Road and Bridge Corporation (CRBC) and China Harbour Engineering Company (CHEC), which focus on transportation infrastructure and marine infrastructure, respectively. In 2006, the company listed shares on the Hong Kong Stock Exchange, followed by a listing on the Shanghai Stock Exchange in 2012.

The company has numerous subsidiaries including John Holland Group, which is an Australia-based construction company focused on infrastructure, and Friede & Goldman, which engineers offshore vessels for the oil and gas industry.

World Bank debarment 
In 2009, the World Bank Group debarred CCCC for eight years due to fraud on highway projects in the Philippines. In that year, the company allegedly transferred $19 million to Teodorin Obiang, son of the President of Equatorial Guinea, according to a 2013 US asset-forfeiture case. In 2010, one of CCCC's subsidiaries, China Harbour Engineering Company, won the contract to build the Magampura Mahinda Rajapaksa Port. In 2018, Bangladesh banned the China Harbour Engineering Company, a CCCC subsidiary, after attempted corruption to win a highway tender.

Bribery allegations 
One of the company's subsidiaries, China Harbour Engineering Company, was under investigation in Bangladesh and The Philippines in 2018 and 2020, respectively, for alleged bribery.

U.S. sanctions 
CCCC is active in dredging projects in areas under dispute in the South China Sea, highway-building in Xinjiang, and building naval logistics installations at Gwadar Port. In August 2020, the United States Department of Commerce placed several CCCC subsidiaries on the Bureau of Industry and Security's Entity List for their construction work to militarize artificial islands in the South China Sea. The same month, the United States Department of Defense released the names of additional “Communist Chinese military companies” operating directly or indirectly in the United States. CCCC was included on the list. In November 2020, Donald Trump issued an executive order prohibiting any American company or individuals from owning shares in companies, including CCCC, that the U.S. Department of Defense has listed as having links to the People's Liberation Army. In December 2020, the United States Department of Commerce added CCCC itself to the Entity List.

Shareholders
CCCC is a "blue chip" stock (part of the CSI 300 Index). State-owned Assets Supervision and Administration Commission of the State Council (SASAC) holds 63.8% of the company's shares. Other shareholders include multiple affiliates of (or funds managed by) Merrill Lynch, BlackRock and JPMorgan Chase.

See also 

 Infrastructure-Based Development
 Asian Infrastructure Investment Bank

References

External links
 

Construction and civil engineering companies of China
Railway construction companies of China
Government-owned companies of China
Construction and civil engineering companies established in 2005
Chinese companies established in 2005
Companies in the Hang Seng China Enterprises Index
Companies in the CSI 100 Index
Companies listed on the Hong Kong Stock Exchange
Companies listed on the Shanghai Stock Exchange
H shares
Defence companies of China